Naser ol Din (also Romanized as Nāşer ol Dīn; also known as Nāşer od Dīn and Nāsirdīn) is a village in Zhan Rural District, in the Central District of Dorud County, Lorestan Province, Iran. At the 2006 census, its population was 9,148, in 1,942 families.

References 

Towns and villages in Dorud County